The 1986 Livingston Open was a men's tennis tournament played on outdoor hard courts that was part of the 1986 Nabisco Grand Prix. It was played at Newark Academy in Livingston, New Jersey in the United States from July 21 through July 28, 1986. Second-seeded Brad Gilbert won his second consecutive singles title at the event.

Finals

Singles

 Brad Gilbert defeated  Mike Leach 6–2, 6–2
 It was Gilbert's 2nd singles title of the year and the 8th of his career.

Doubles

 Bob Green /  Wally Masur defeated  Sammy Giammalva Jr. /  Greg Holmes 5–7, 6–4, 6–4
 It was Green's only title of the year and the 1st of his career. It was Masur's 2nd title of the year and the 7th of his career.

References

External links
 ITF tournament edition details

 
Livingston Open
1986 in sports in New Jersey
1986 in American tennis